Valerie Cruz (born July 18, 1976) is an American actress. Cruz was born in Elizabeth, New Jersey of Cuban ancestry. She attended Florida State University and received a BFA theatre degree.

Career 
She has appeared in films such as Cellular and played Grace Santiago, a main character in Nip/Tuck, but she left the show just after the first season.
She has made guest appearances in series such as Grey's Anatomy and Las Vegas. In 2007, she appeared as Connie Murphy, a tough Chicago police detective, in SciFi Channel's adaptation of The Dresden Files. The show lasted for one season.

Cruz played Maria Nolan on the CW's Hidden Palms. In 2008, she appeared in the third season of Dexter, playing Syl Prado, the wife of Assistant District Attorney Miguel Prado (Jimmy Smits).

In 2009, she appeared in the horror film The Devil's Tomb and the HBO series True Blood, in which she played the part of Isabel. That same year, Cruz played Olivia in the film La Linea. In 2010 she became part of the cast of the ABC drama Off the Map, which was canceled by ABC On May 13, 2011. In 2011 she had a recurring role as a Homeland Security agent in the Syfy series Alphas. In 2012, she played an evil doctor in the "Organ Grinder" episode of Grimm; the wife of a dictator in the "Enemy of the State" episode of Scandal; and an investigator for the football league in the episode "Spell It Out" of Necessary Roughness. She also starred on The Following as Agent Gina Mendez.

Awards
 2008 ALMA Awards Nomination; Best lead actress in a drama series for The Dresden Files on SciFi Channel
 2009 Screen Actors Guild Award Nomination; Best ensemble cast in a drama series for Dexter on Showtime Networks

Filmography

Film

Television

References

External links
 

1976 births
Living people
Actors from Elizabeth, New Jersey
American people of Cuban descent
American film actresses
American television actresses
Hispanic and Latino American actresses
Florida State University alumni
Actresses from New Jersey
21st-century American actresses